The 1930 South Dakota State Jackrabbits football team was an American football team that represented South Dakota State University in the North Central Conference (NCC) during the 1930 college football season. In its third season under head coach Cy Kasper, the team compiled a 2–6–1 record and was outscored by a total of 197 to 48.

Schedule

References

South Dakota State
South Dakota State Jackrabbits football seasons
South Dakota State Jackrabbits football